Dammert is a surname that may refer to:

 Eduardo Dibós Dammert (1898–1987), Peruvian politician
 Johann Ludwig Dammert (1788–1855), First Mayor and President of the Senate of the sovereign city-state of Hamburg
 José Antonio Dammert Bellido (1917–2008), Peruvian Roman Catholic bishop